Vitor Miranda (born March 10, 1979) is a Brazilian kickboxer and mixed martial artist. He was the K-1 Brazil 2005 and K-1 Turkey 2007 super heavyweight tournament champion.

Biography
Vitor Miranda was born in Joinville, Santa Catarina, Brazil. When growing up, he was interested in martial arts but did not start training before turning 21, when his friend introduced him to Muay Thai.

Currently, Miranda trains in the U.S. at Imperial Athletics in Boca Raton, Florida.

Kickboxing career
After only two years of practice and at the same time working part-time as a video store clerk, Miranda turned pro in 2001. He made his K-1 debut in 2003, quitting his job to become a full-time fighter.

Miranda's first K-1 fight was on February 23, 2003, at K-1 Brazil GP. He lost the fight against Carlos de Lima by unanimous decision. On October 22, 2005, he entered the K-1 Heavyweight Factory tournament in Sao Paulo and achieved the first success of his young career by winning the Grand Prix with three consecutive knockouts over Nelson Vargas, Lucio Silva and Asmir Burgic.

After two years of fighting in smaller shows in Brazil, Miranda was selected to participate in one of the regional K-1 qualifying tournaments, on November 2, 2007, in Istanbul, Turkey. In the quarterfinals he was matched up against local fan favorite Erhan Deniz. He won the hard fought battle by majority decision, as well as his other next two fights in the evening and was declared the K-1 Turkey champion. The win qualified him for K-1 European Elimination GP held on February 9, 2008, in Budapest, Hungary.

He defeated Tsotne Rogava by unanimous decision in the first round of the 2013 Tantneft Cup on February 23, 2013.

In the quarterfinals of the Tafneft Cup, he defeated Netherlands' Jantje Siersema by unanimous decision.

In the semifinals of the Tafneft Cup, Vitor Miranda faced the local Russia's fighter Mikhail Tyuterev.  Miranda lost the fight via a controversial unanimous decision.

Mixed martial arts career

Early career
Concurrent to his kickboxing career, Miranda made his professional MMA debut in November 2003. He fought in MMA sporadically over the next ten years, obtaining a record of 9 wins against 3 losses with all but one of his wins coming by way of a finish.

The Ultimate Fighter: Brazil
In February 2014, it was revealed that Miranda was chosen as a fighter to compete on The Ultimate Fighter: Brazil 3.

To get into the TUF house, Miranda defeated Bruno Silva via head-kick knockout. He was the second Heavyweight chosen to be on Team Sonnen.  In his second fight on the show, he faced Antônio Branjão and won via TKO in the first round.  In the semifinals, he faced Richardson Moreira and again won by TKO, this time in the second round.

Ultimate Fighting Championship
Having secured his place in the final, Miranda faced fellow finalist Antônio Carlos Júnior at the Ultimate Fighter: Brazil 3 finale on May 31, 2014. He lost the fight via unanimous decision.

Miranda faced promotional newcomer Jake Collier in a middleweight bout on December 20, 2014, at UFC Fight Night 58. He won the fight via knockout in the last second of the first round. The win also earned Miranda his first Performance of the Night bonus award.

Miranda was expected to face Nick Catone on April 18, 2015, at UFC on Fox 15.  However, Catone abruptly announced his retirement on March 25, citing a litany of injuries and a history of chronic back pain. In turn, Miranda was also pulled from the card citing a rib injury.

Miranda faced Clint Hester on August 1, 2015, at UFC 190. He won the fight via TKO in the second round.

Miranda faced Marcelo Guimarães on March 5, 2016, at UFC 196. He won the fight via TKO in the second round.

Miranda faced Chris Camozzi on May 29, 2016, at UFC Fight Night 88. He lost the fight by unanimous decision.

Miranda faced Marvin Vettori on June 25, 2017, at UFC Fight Night 112. He lost the fight by unanimous decision.

Miranda faced promotional newcomer Julian Marquez on December 16, 2017, at UFC on Fox 26. However on December 4, it was announced that Miranda was pulled from the fight due to injury. He lost the fight via unanimous decision.

Miranda faced newcomer Abu Azaitar on July 22, 2018, on UFC Fight Night 134. He lost the fight by unanimous decision and was subsequently released from the promotion.

Championships and achievements

Kickboxing
 2007 K-1 Fighting Network Turkey champion
 2005 K-1 Brazil Grand Prix in São Paulo champion
 2004 K-1 Brazil Challenge runner up
 2003 Storm Muay Thai Brazil champion
 2003 South Brazilian Muay Thai champion
 2002 Catarinense de Muay Thai champion
 2002 Catarinense de Muay Thai champion

Mixed martial arts 
 Ultimate Fighting Championship
The Ultimate Fighter: Brazil 3 Heavyweight Tournament Runner Up
Performance of the Night (One time) vs. Jake Collier

Mixed martial arts record

|-
|Loss
|align=center|12–7
|Abu Azaitar
|Decision (unanimous)
|UFC Fight Night: Shogun vs. Smith 
|
|align=center|3
|align=center|5:00
|Hamburg, Germany
|
|-
|Loss
|align=center|12–6
|Marvin Vettori
|Decision (unanimous)
|UFC Fight Night: Chiesa vs. Lee
|
|align=center|3
|align=center|5:00
|Oklahoma City, Oklahoma, United States
|
|-
|Loss
|align=center|12–5
|Chris Camozzi
|Decision (unanimous)
|UFC Fight Night: Almeida vs. Garbrandt
|
|align=center|3
|align=center|5:00
|Las Vegas, Nevada, United States
|
|-
|Win
|align=center|12–4
|Marcelo Guimarães
|TKO (head kick and punches) 
|UFC 196
|
|align=center|2
|align=center|1:09
|Las Vegas, Nevada, United States
|
|-
|Win
|align=center|11–4
|Clint Hester
|TKO (punches and elbows)
|UFC 190
|
|align=center|2
|align=center|2:38
|Rio de Janeiro, Brazil
|
|-
| Win
|align=center| 10–4
|Jake Collier
|TKO (head kick and punches)
|UFC Fight Night: Machida vs. Dollaway
|
|align=center|1
|align=center|4:59
|Barueri, Brazil
|
|-
| Loss
|align=center| 9–4
| Antônio Carlos Júnior
|Decision (unanimous)
|The Ultimate Fighter Brazil 3 Finale: Miocic vs. Maldonado
| 
| align=center|3
| align=center|5:00
|São Paulo, Brazil
|
|-
| Win
|align=center| 9–3
| João Paulo Pereira
| TKO (knees and punches)
| Nitrix Champion Fight 15
| 
|align=center| 1
|align=center| 0:38
|Joinville, Brazil
|
|-
| Win
|align=center| 8–3
| Elton Rodrigues
| Submission (arm-triangle choke)
| Mestre do Combate
| 
|align=center| 1
|align=center| 4:23
|Rio de Janeiro, Brazil
|
|-
| Win
|align=center| 7–3
| Eli Reger
| TKO (punches)
| Nitrix Champion Fight 11
| 
|align=center| 1
|align=center| 3:32
|Joinville, Brazil
|
|-
| Win
|align=center| 6–3
| Marcelo Cruz
| Submission (rear-naked choke)
| Top Fight Brasil
| 
|align=center| 1
|align=center| N/A
|Goiânia, Brazil
|
|-
| Loss
|align=center| 5–3
| Guto Inocente
| Submission (punches)
| Shooto - Brazil 17
| 
|align=center| 2
|align=center| 1:43
|Rio de Janeiro, Brazil
|
|-
| Win
|align=center| 5–2
| Cassio Drummond
| TKO (retirement)
| Bitetti Combat 7
| 
|align=center| 1
|align=center| 5:00
|Rio de Janeiro, Brazil
|
|-
| Loss
|align=center| 4–2
| Fábio Maldonado
| Decision (unanimous)
| Bitetti Combat 4
| 
|align=center| 3
|align=center| 5:00
|Rio de Janeiro, Brazil
|
|-
| Win
|align=center| 4–1
| Renato Matos
| TKO (knee)
| Shooto - Brazil 11
| 
|align=center| 1
|align=center| 0:15
| Rio de Janeiro, Brazil
|
|-
| Win
|align=center| 3–1
| Gustavo Moia
| KO (knee)
| Shooto - Brazil 9
| 
|align=center| 1
|align=center| N/A
|Fortaleza, Brazil
|
|-
| Win
|align=center| 2–1
| Sidney da Silva
| KO (head kick)
| Shooto - Brazil 8
| 
|align=center| 2
|align=center| 0:45
|Rio de Janeiro, Brazil
|
|-
| Loss
|align=center| 1–1
| Fábio Maldonado
| Decision (unanimous)
| Mo Team League 2
| 
|align=center| 3
|align=center| 5:00
| São Paulo, Brazil
|
|-
| Win
|align=center| 1–0
| Rivanildo Riva
| Decision (unanimous)
| K-1 MMA in Brazil
| 
|align=center| 3
|align=center| 3:00
| Curitiba, Brazil
|
|-
|}

Mixed martial arts exhibition record

|-
|Win
|align=center|3-0
|Richardson Moreira
|TKO (punches)
|The Ultimate Fighter: Brazil 3
| (airdate)
|align=center|2
|align=center|0:00
|São Paulo, Brazil
|
|-
|Win
|align=center|2-0
|Antônio Branjão
|TKO (punches)
|The Ultimate Fighter: Brazil 3
| (airdate)
|align=center|1
|align=center|0:00
|São Paulo, Brazil
|
|-
|Win
|align=center|1-0
|Bruno Silva
|KO (head kick)
|The Ultimate Fighter: Brazil 3
| (airdate)
|align=center|2
|align=center|0:00
|São Paulo, Brazil
|
|-

Kickboxing record
{| class="wikitable" style="margin:0.5em auto; font-size:85%"
|-
|style="text-align: center" colspan=8|24 Wins (18 (T)KO's, 4 Decisions), 8 Losses
|-
| align="center" style="border-style: none none solid solid; background: #f0f0f0"|Date
| align="center" style="border-style: none none solid solid; background: #f0f0f0"|Result
| align="center" style="border-style: none none solid solid; background: #f0f0f0"|Opponent
| align="center" style="border-style: none none solid solid; background: #f0f0f0"|Event
| align="center" style="border-style: none none solid solid; background: #f0f0f0"|Method
| align="center" style="border-style: none none solid solid; background: #f0f0f0"|Round
| align="center" style="border-style: none none solid solid; background: #f0f0f0"|Time
|-
| 27/04/2013
|  Loss
|  Mikhail Tyuterev
| Tatneft Arena World Cup 2013 1/2 final (+91 kg), Kazan, Russia
| Decision
| 4
| 3:00
|-
| 27/04/2013
|  Win
|  Jantje Siersema
| Tatneft Arena World Cup 2013 2nd selection 1/4 final (+91 kg), Kazan, Russia
| Decision (Unanimous)
| 4
| 3:00
|-
| 23/02/2013
| Win
|  Tsotne Rogava
| Tatneft Arena World Cup 2013 4th selection 1/8 final (+91 kg), Kazan, Russia
| Decision (Unanimous)
| 4
| 3:00
|-
| 11/06/2009
| Loss
|  Thiago de Jesus Beowulf
| Arena Brazil II, Sao Paulo, Brazil
| Decision (Split)
| 5
| 3:00
|-
| 05/30/2009
| Win
|  Marco Rogério
| V Desafio Profissional de Muay Thai, Pacaembu, Brazil
| KO
| 2
|
|-
| 05/17/2008
| Loss
|  Dzevad Poturak
| K-1 Fighting Network Austria 2008, Austria
| Decision
| 3
| 3:00
|-
| 02/09/2008
| Loss
|  Zabit Samedov
| K-1 World GP 2008 in Budapest, Hungary
| Decision
| 3
| 3:00
|-
| 11/02/2007
| Win
|  Karl Glyschinsky
| K-1 Fighting Network Turkey 2007
| TKO (Doctor stoppage)
| 1
| 3:00
|-
| 11/02/2007
| Win
|  Dzevad Poturak
| K-1 Fighting Network Turkey 2007
| KO
| 3
| 2:45
|-
| 11/02/2007
| Win
|  Erhan Deniz
| K-1 Fighting Network Turkey 2007
| Decision (Majority)
| 3
| 3:00
|-
| 07/07/2007
| Win
|  Guto Inocente
| Shooto Brazil 3, Rio de Janeiro, Brazil
| Decision
| 5
| 3:00
|-
| 04/14/2007
| Win
|  Guigao
| Demolition V, São Paulo, Brazil
| KO (Left body hook)
| 1
| 0:50
|-
| 03/24/2007
| Win
|  Ronaldo Leite
| Shooto Brazil 2, Rio de Janeiro, Brazil
| KO
| 3
| 4:17
|-
| 03/10/2007
| Win
|  Eduardo Maiorino
| Floripa Fight 3, Florianopolis, Brazil
| KO (Right hook)
| 1
| 3:00
|-
| 12/17/2006
| Win
|  Dany Marhold
| Jungle Fight 7, Ljubliana, Slovenia
| KO (Left high kick)
| 1
| 2:15
|-
| 09/23/2006
| Win
|  Eduardo Maiorino
| Demolition IV, São Paulo, Brazil
| KO (Left high kick)
| 2
| 1:16
|-
| 03/25/2006
| Win
|  Cleber Adao
| K-1 Rules Heavyweight Factory GP II, São Paulo, Brazil
| KO (Left body hook)
| 2
| 1:43
|-
| 10/22/2005
| Win
|  Asmir Burgic
| K-1 Brazil Grand Prix 2005 in São Paulo, Brazil
| KO (Left body hook)
| 2
| 2:38
|-
| 10/22/2005
| Win
|  Lucio de Freitas Silva
| K-1 Brazil Grand Prix 2005 in São Paulo, Brazil
| KO
|
|
|-
| 10/22/2005
| Win
|  Nelson Vargas
| K-1 Brazil Grand Prix 2005 in São Paulo, Brazil
| KO (Punches)
| 1
| 1:54
|-
| 10/30/2004
| Loss
|  Eduardo Maiorino
| K-1 Brazil 2004 Challenge, Goiania, Brazil
| Decision (Unanimous)
| 3
| 3:00
|-
| 10/30/2004
| Win
|  Dimirty Wanderlei
| K-1 Brazil 2004 Challenge, Goiania, Brazil
| KO
| 3
| 2:39
|-
| 10/30/2004
| Win
|  Flavio da Costa
| K-1 Brazil 2004 Challenge, Goiania, Brazil
| KO
| 1
| 1:15
|-
| 06/26/2004
| Win
|  Great Kusatsu
| K-1 Beast 2004 in Shizuoka, Japan
| Decision (Unanimous)
| 3
| 3:00
|-
| 09/13/2003
| Loss
|  Assuerio Silva
| Stomp GP, Florianopoils, Brazil
| Decision
| 5
| 3:00
|-
| 02/23/2003
| Loss
|  Jefferson Silva
| K-1 World Grand Prix 2003 Preliminary Brazil, Brazil
| KO
| 2
| 2:01
|-
| 02/23/2003
| Loss
|  Carlos Lima
| K-1 World Grand Prix 2003 Preliminary Brazil, Brazil
| Decision (Unanimous)
| 3
| 3:00
|-

See also
 List of current UFC fighters
 List of male mixed martial artists
 List of male kickboxers
 List of K-1 events

References

External links
 
 
 

1979 births
Living people
Brazilian male kickboxers
Heavyweight kickboxers
Brazilian male mixed martial artists
Heavyweight mixed martial artists
Ultimate Fighting Championship male fighters
Brazilian Muay Thai practitioners
Brazilian Sanshou practitioners
Brazilian savateurs
Brazilian male judoka
Brazilian practitioners of Brazilian jiu-jitsu
Mixed martial artists utilizing sanshou
Mixed martial artists utilizing Muay Thai
Mixed martial artists utilizing savate
Mixed martial artists utilizing judo
Mixed martial artists utilizing Brazilian jiu-jitsu
People from Joinville
Sportspeople from Santa Catarina (state)